Triton is a town that lies on Big Triton Island just off the coast of northeastern Newfoundland, in the Canadian province of Newfoundland and Labrador. Triton is the economic center of Green Bay South. According to Statistics Canada, Triton's population fell from 983 in 2016 to 896 in 2021. The town of Triton has grown more with new businesses and buildings opening in 2017. Triton also has a state of the art swimming pool, skatepark and a small basketball court, there are trailer campsites nearby too.

History
In the earliest days of settlement ties were strong with Twillingate, where fishermen traded cod. In the 1890s the first stores were kept by families at Little Triton as agents of merchants at Little Bay Islands. A business was established at Great Triton which supplied many fishermen in the area and became involved in supplying schooners for the Labrador fishery. With a strong inshore fishery, a growing involvement in the fishery in Labrador and winter logging for lumber and pulp and paper industries, the population of Triton grew considerably to 470 in 1935 and 625 in 1951. Triton East and West incorporated in 1955 and Jim's Cove and Card's Harbour incorporated in 1958. In 1961 the two municipalities amalgamated as a rural district.

After the causeway was built in 1968, linking the island to Pilley's Island and the mainland, the community continued to grow. Because of the increasing dependency on the road it was the end for Little Triton, which was declining in population. Since it was not on the road it was soon abandoned. In 1980 a new fish plant, Triton Seafood's, was opened at Little Triton Harbour, and a road was built to it. In the same year the rural district was re-incorporated as the town of Triton.

Demographics 

See also
List of cities and towns in Newfoundland and Labrador
Springdale, Newfoundland and Labrador

References

Populated coastal places in Canada
Towns in Newfoundland and Labrador
Fishing communities in Canada